Harold Correa (born 26 June 1988 in Épinay-sur-Seine) is a French athlete specialising in the triple jump. He represented his country at the 2016 World Indoor Championships finishing ninth.

His personal bests in the event are 16.92 metres outdoors (0.0 m/s, Villeneuve-d'Ascq 2013) and 16.94 metres indoors (Aubière 2013).

Competition record

References

1988 births
Living people
French male triple jumpers
Sportspeople from Épinay-sur-Seine
Athletes (track and field) at the 2016 Summer Olympics
Olympic athletes of France
Olympic male triple jumpers